Paul Lazarus Germain (born June 6, 1959) is an American writer, director, and producer. Among the shows Germain has written, produced or directed are Rugrats, Recess, "The Big Splash" from Even Stevens, Lloyd in Space, and The Tracey Ullman Show. Germain (along with Arlene Klasky and Gábor Csupó) was one of the creators of the award-winning animated series Rugrats for Nickelodeon, and he was a primary creative force for the series. He left the show on its third season to team up with his Rugrats colleague Joe Ansolabehere, to create Disney's Recess and Lloyd in Space. Germain and Ansolabehere formed the television production company Paul & Joe Productions. They also worked on Pound Puppies for Discovery Family and Disney Junior's Goldie & Bear.

Germain was a producer assistant when he was 24 on Terms of Endearment, Say Anything..., Big and Broadcast News which was produced or directed by James L. Brooks for Gracie Films.

Germain's son was the inspiration for the Rugrats character Tommy Pickles; the antagonist, Angelica Pickles, was based on a bully from his childhood.

Germain was a screenwriter on Tinker Bell and the Great Fairy Rescue. He is currently working on live-action projects.

References

External links

American animated film directors
American animated film producers
American television directors
American television producers
American male screenwriters
Living people
American animators
American casting directors
American voice directors
1959 births
Disney Television Animation people
Nickelodeon Animation Studio people
Showrunners